Michael James (Mickey) Ross (born 1980) is an alpine skier from New Zealand.

In the 2006 Winter Olympics at Turin, he came 31st in the Slalom. He was the top finisher of the New Zealand alpine skiers despite a fall in the first run.

He now resides in Wanaka on New Zealands' South Island, where he works as a photographer and part-time model.

References

External links  
Profile at the New Zealand Olympic Committee website 
Profile at the SR Sports Records website

Living people
1980 births
New Zealand male alpine skiers
Olympic alpine skiers of New Zealand
Alpine skiers at the 2006 Winter Olympics